is a CG anime that first aired on February 6, 2013, in Japan. The anime is created with the MikuMikuDance animation software and is the first MMD-based program to air on TV.

Plot
The story is set in the year 9013 (Mobile Century 8013) where humans no longer inhabit the planet Earth. However, remaining military robots continue to fight for unknown purpose(s). Three non-combatant robots, Fuji, Kato, and Mori attempt to end the war that lasted for 7 millennia by investigating on human laughter.

Characters
 

Narrator

Media 
The anime aired for 12 episodes during the Winter 2013 anime season in Japan, on Tokyo MX and also streamed online on Niconico. Crunchyroll also broadcast the anime to all regions outside Japan. KEI, the designer for Hatsune Miku (as well as other Vocaloids) was the character designer for Straight Title Robot Anime. The director is Kōtarō Ishidate, and the animation director is cort.

The opening theme is "Break the War", sung by Confection Planning, and written and arranged by Steel Soldier.

References

External links
 Official Website 

2013 anime television series debuts
Comedy anime and manga
Science fiction anime and manga
Yaoyorozu